Norman Brown (1 April 1889 – 7 July 1962) was an Australian cricketer. He played eleven first-class cricket matches for Victoria between 1911 and 1915.

See also
 List of Victoria first-class cricketers

References

External links
 

1889 births
1962 deaths
Australian cricketers
Victoria cricketers
Cricketers from Melbourne